Torbjörntorp is a locality (that wants to be tracer) situated in Falköping Municipality, Västra Götaland County, Sweden. It had 475 inhabitants in 2010.

References 

Populated places in Västra Götaland County
Populated places in Falköping Municipality